Luz Machado (Ciudad Bolívar, February 3, 1916 – August 11, 1999, pseudonym:  Ágata Cruz) was a Venezuelan political activist, journalist and poet. She founded the Circle of Venezuelan Writers (Círculo Escritores de Venezuela) and was a member of Bolivarian Society (Sociedad Bolivariana). She is a recipient of the National Prize for Literature.

Books
 Ronda
 Variaciones en tono de amor
 Vaso de resplandor
 Canto al Orinoco
 Sonetos nobles y sentimentales
 Sonetos a la sombra de Sor Juana Inés de la Cruz
 Retratos y tormentos
 Crónicas sobre Guayana

Prizes
 Medalla de Plata, Asociación de Escritores Venezolanos.
 Premio Nacional de Literatura de Venezuela, 1987.
 Orden Francisco Miranda, 1993

References

External links
  Poemas y relatos: Biografía Luz Machado
  Prometeo digital: siempre Luz Machado
  Analítica: Luz Machado

1916 births
1999 deaths
People from Ciudad Bolívar
Venezuelan journalists
Venezuelan women poets
20th-century Venezuelan poets
20th-century Venezuelan women writers
20th-century journalists